Nicolás Suárez may refer to:
Nicolás Suárez Bremec (born 1977), Uruguayan football (soccer) player
Nicolás Suárez Callaú (1851–1940), multinational rubber empire founder
Nicolás Suárez Vaca (born 1978), Bolivian football (soccer) player
Nicolás Suárez Province, province in Pando Department, Bolivia
Nicolás Suárez (Chilean footballer) (born 1982), Chilean footballer
Nicolás Suárez (Uruguayan footballer) (born 1999)

Suarez, Nicolas